Kalateh-ye Akhund (also Romanized as Kalāteh-ye Ākhūnd) is a village in Fariman Rural District, in the Central District of Fariman County, Razavi Khorasan Province, Iran. At the 2006 census, its population was 131, in 38 families.

References 

Populated places in Fariman County